Torrington is a hamlet in central Alberta, Canada within Kneehill County.

The hamlet is located in Census Division No. 5 and in the federal riding of Crowfoot.

The main industry is agriculture.

The community is home to the Gopher Hole Museum, dedicated to stuffed Richardson's ground squirrels (technically not gophers) in anthropomorphic taxidermy settings.

A very large outdoor gopher sculpture (12 ft high) named "Clem T. GoFur" is located in the village.

All 11 of Torrington's fire hydrants were painted to look like gophers.

Torrington was incorporated as a village until 1997, when it dissolved to hamlet status under the jurisdiction of Kneehill County.

Demographics 

See also 
List of communities in Alberta
List of designated places in Alberta
List of former urban municipalities in Alberta
List of hamlets in Alberta

References 

Designated places in Alberta
Hamlets in Alberta
Former villages in Alberta
Kneehill County
Populated places disestablished in 1997